The ranat kaeo is a crystallophone consisting of struck glass bars of varying length, used in the classical music of Thailand. It is usually played with a soft padded mallet.

Related instruments
Xylophone: an array of wooden bars of various lengths, struck.  Greek for "wood sound"; "xylo" is Greek for "wood" and "phone" is Greek for "sound"
Lithophone: an array of rocks... "litho" is Greek for "rock".
Pagophone: an array of ice bars... "pago" is Greek for "ice".

External links
"Glass Xylophone", PBSKids.org. Accessed: February 4, 2017.

Plaque percussion idiophones
Crystallophones
Thai musical instruments